I Had to Fall in Love was the 1978 debut (and thus far only) solo album released by former Supremes lead singer Jean Terrell, on the A&M label. The album was completed five years after she left the Supremes. Shortly after it's release, promotion was stopped completely because of Terrell's religious beliefs that prevented her from promoting the album in a way that she did not favor. In 2006, an independent label re-released the album in CD format. The title track is also available on the Motown compilation CD The Supremes: Greatest Hits and Rare Classics, 70's.

Track listing
"Don't Stop Reaching for the Top" (Jimmie Davis, Jeffrey Osborne) - (4:13)
"No One Like My Baby" (Fred Bliffert) - (3:45)
"Rising Cost of Love" (Bobby Martin, Len Ron Hanks, Zane Grey) - (3:34)
"Change Up" (Len Ron Hanks, Zane Grey) - (5:00)
"How Can You Live (Without Love)" (Len Ron Hanks, Zane Grey) - (3:21)
"I Had to Fall in Love" (Benny Gallagher, Graham Lyle) - (4:16)
"That's the Way Love Grows" (Frank McDonald, Chris Rae, Gerry Shury, Ron Roker) - (3:30)
"You've Been So Good for Me" (Len Ron Hanks, Zane Grey) - (4:23)
"No Limit" (Len Ron Hanks, Zane Grey) - (3:19)

Personnel

Singers
 Jean Terrell - lead vocals
 Sherlie Matthews, Venetta Fields,  Clydie King, Lynda Laurence - backing vocals

Musicians
 Scotty Harris, Melvin Webb, James Gadson - drums
 Danny Whatley, Harry E. Davis, Tony Newton - bass guitar
 Benorce Blackman, Paul Flaherty, Melvin "Wah Wah" Watson, Johnny McGhee - guitar
 Leo Ron Hanks - keyboards, acoustic piano
 Jimmie Davis, Billy Osborne - keyboards
 Jeffrey Osborne, Eddie "Bongo" Brown - percussion
 Sylvester Rivers - Fender Rhodes piano
 Fred Jackson - alto saxophone

Production credits
 Produced by Bobby Martin for Bobby Martin Productions
 Recorded and Mixed at Total Experience Recording Studios, Hollywood
 Sound Engineer - Douglas Greaves
 Norman Seeff - photography

External links
Discogs

1978 debut albums
Albums produced by Bobby Martin
Albums arranged by Bobby Martin
A&M Records albums
Albums recorded at Total Experience Recording Studios